Karakeşli   is a village in Erdemli ilçe (district) of Mersin Province, Turkey. The population of the village was 887 as of 2012. The population of the village is composed of a once-nomadic tribe (a subunit of Sarıkeçili Turkmen tribe) which was settled in 1865 in its present location. The major economic activity is greenhouse farming. Citrus cucumber and tomato are  main crops.

References

Villages in Erdemli District